Mustapha Khan is an American film and television director, best known for such films and television shows as Imagining America, Rocksteady, Sesame Street and The Electric Company.

The son of a Caribbean immigrant, Khan graduated in 1980 from Moorestown Friends School.

He won a 1992 Daytime Emmy for his Sesame Street short film Dancing Shoes and also obtained a Primetime Emmy nomination for work on Sesame Street Jam: A Musical Celebration.

References

External links

American film directors
American television directors
American film producers
African-American film directors
African-American television directors
African-American film producers
Living people
Moorestown Friends School alumni
Primetime Emmy Award winners
Year of birth missing (living people)
21st-century African-American people